The 2013 Morocco Tennis Tour – Meknes was a professional tennis tournament played on clay courts. It was the sixth edition of the tournament which was part of the 2013 ATP Challenger Tour. It took place in Meknes, Morocco between 9 and 15 September 2013.

Singles main-draw entrants

Seeds

 1 Rankings are as of August 26, 2013.

Other entrants
The following players received wildcards into the singles main draw:
  Hicham Khaddari
  Yassine Idmbarek
  Younès Rachidi
  Mehdi Ziadi

The following players received entry into the singles main draw as an alternate:
  Daniele Giorgini

The following players received entry from the qualifying draw:
  Lukas Jastraunig
  Michael Bois
  Marc Rath
  Laurent Lokoli

Champions

Singles

 Cedrik-Marcel Stebe def.  Yannik Reuter 6–1, 4–6, 6–2

Doubles

 Alessandro Giannessi /  Gianluca Naso def.  Gerard Granollers /  Jordi Samper-Montana 7–5, 7–6(7–3)

External links
Official Website
ITF Search
ATP official site

2013
Meknes